Swampton is an unincorporated community in Magoffin County, Kentucky, United States.  It lies along Route 7 southeast of the city of Salyersville, the county seat of Magoffin County.  Its elevation is 919 feet (280 m).

References

Unincorporated communities in Magoffin County, Kentucky
Unincorporated communities in Kentucky